The Zealot Gene is the 22nd studio album by the British rock band Jethro Tull, released on 28 January 2022 by Inside Out Music. Nearly five years in production, it is their first studio album since The Jethro Tull Christmas Album (2003), and their first of all original material since J-Tull Dot Com (1999), marking the longest gap between the band's studio albums.

The album entered the UK Albums Chart at number 9, becoming Jethro Tull's first UK top ten album since 1972.

Background
The album originated in January 2017, when vocalist and flautist Ian Anderson started to write new songs and arrange the shape of the album. Early into the process, he decided that it was to be a Jethro Tull album because the line-up of the group at that time had become the longest lasting in its history, but had not been involved on a studio recording under its name. It was a productive time, and seven tracks were recorded in March of that year. Further work on the album was put on hold in order for Anderson and the band to finish touring commitments in 2018 and 2019, and Anderson felt it would have been unfair to have the group back in the studio during the small amounts of down time. Following the outbreak of the COVID-19 pandemic and subsequent lockdowns, in early 2021 Anderson "gave up hope" and decided to put down his parts to the remaining five songs alone at his home studio. These last five songs are acoustic based and without drums, partly because Hammond was unable to record at home. The band recorded their individual parts in a similar manner, leaving Anderson to assemble the various tracks to form a complete song. By July 2021, the album was complete and delivered to Inside Out.

The Zealot Gene is the first Jethro Tull studio album to feature an entirely new lineup (other than Anderson), with guitarist Florian Opahle (who left the band between its recording and release), bassist David Goodier, keyboardist John O'Hara, and drummer Scott Hammond replacing four-fifths of The Jethro Tull Christmas Album lineup – Martin Barre, Jonathan Noyce, Andrew Giddings and Doane Perry respectively. The new lineup is the same that performed on Anderson's most recent solo album, Homo Erraticus (2014). The album is the first since This Was (1968) not to involve Barre in any capacity, as he was not asked to return when Anderson reformed Jethro Tull.

Songs
The Zealot Gene is not a concept album, but biblical references are made throughout and Anderson began writing each song with a passage from the Bible. "Mrs. Tibbets" references the mother of Paul Tibbets, the pilot of the Enola Gay who dropped the atomic bomb on Hiroshima in 1945. The title track was inspired partly by the rise in right-wing populism "and how extremist views seem to spread more freely and everything gets more exaggerated – sometimes through news stories, and some from ferocious tweets." Anderson said that "Mine Is the Mountain" is not a reflection of his own view, but rather about seeing God as a victim and the "desperation of man to create this figurehead, and in human form, because that’s the only way we can understand it."

Release
The album entered the UK Albums Chart at number 9, becoming Jethro Tull's first UK top ten album since Thick as a Brick and the compilation Living in the Past, both from 1972.

Critical reception

At Metacritic, which assigns a normalised rating out of 100 to reviews from mainstream critics, The Zealot Gene received a mean score of 67 based on 4 reviews, indicating "generally favourable reviews".

Lee Zimmerman of American Songwriter described The Zealot Gene as a "concept album in the vintage manner of Thick as a Brick" with the "idyllic imagery of Songs From the Wood and Heavy Horses". Zimmerman opined that the album is a "noteworthy effort and a well-executed return" for the band. Mojo writer John Bungey compared the album with Ian Anderson's 2014 solo album Homo Erraticus, and praised that "here are 12 less erratic songs on diverse subjects". However, Bungey also pointed out that "the rockier tunes need louder guitars and it's the folkier moments with mandolin, Irish whistle and accordion that shine brightest". Hugh Fielder of Classic Rock described the album as "light, bright, tight and recognisably Tull, with plenty of room for [Anderson's] flute to fly". However, Fielder also stated that he missed Martin Barre's "heavy rock dynamics" and mentioned "Anderson's increasingly frail voice".

Track listing
All music and lyrics by Ian Anderson.

Personnel
Jethro Tull
 Ian Anderson – vocals, flute, acoustic guitar, mandolin, whistle, harmonica
 Florian Opahle – electric guitar
 David Goodier – bass guitar
 John O'Hara – piano, keyboards, accordion, organ
 Scott Hammond – drums
 Joe Parrish-James – guitar (track 11)

Production
 Ian Anderson – producer, stereo mixing, photography, artwork concept
 Michael Nyandoro – engineer
 Nick Watson – mastering
 Jakko Jakszyk – 5.1 surround sound mixing
 James Anderson – photography
 Thomas Ewerhard – artwork design
 Tim Bowness – liner notes
 Mastering at Fluid Mastering

Charts

References

2022 albums
Inside Out Music albums
Jethro Tull (band) albums